William Tunks (8 April 1816 – 12 April 1883) was an Australian politician.

He was born in the Nepean district to timber merchant John Tunks and Esther Arndell. He was an apprentice carpenter at Parramatta and later the licensee of an inn and a metal contractor. He was the first mayor of St Leonards and was re-elected fifteen times. On 11 December 1838 he married Margaret McCone Bisseck, with whom he had eleven children. In 1864 he was elected to the New South Wales Legislative Assembly for St Leonards, serving until his retirement in 1874. Tunks died at St Leonards in 1883.

He was also a cricketer. He played one first-class match for New South Wales in 1855/56.

See also
 List of New South Wales representative cricketers

References

 

1816 births
1883 deaths
Members of the New South Wales Legislative Assembly
19th-century Australian politicians
Australian cricketers
New South Wales cricketers
Mayors of St Leonards
Burials at Gore Hill Cemetery